Bhojpur district is one of the thirty-eight districts of Bihar state, India.

This is list of villages of Bhojpur district according to respective blocks.

Agiaon 

 Agiaon
 Ahila
 Akurha
 Amarpur
 Anantpur
 Araila
 Baghi
 Banauli
 Bankat
 Bargaon
 Barhampur Mehdanra
 Baruna
 Berath
 Bhagwanpur
 Bhaluni
 Bhikhampur
 Bisambharpur
 Bisamhra
 Chansi
 Chauria
 Chhaprapur
 Chilhar
 Chipura
 Chiraili
 Dhakni
 Dhobha
 Dihra
 Dilia
 Dumaria
 Dundhua
 Ekauna
 Ekauni
 Gordiha
 Gorpa
 Isarpura
 Kamaria
 Karbasin
 Kashipur Chamari
 Keshwarpur
 Khaneth
 Kharaich
 Kharainacha
 Kheri
 Khopira
 Kirkiri
 Laharpa
 Lahauripur
 Lasarhi
 Madhopur
 Mahpur
 Maranpur
 Megharia
 Misraulia
 Muradpur
 Muzaffarpur
 Nadhi
 Narainaganj
 Narauni
  Narayanpur
 Nonaur
 Paharpur Khurd
 Panwar
 Paswan
 Pauna
 Ranni
 Ratnarh
 Rudarpur
 Sauna
 Seothara
 Sewantha
 Situhari
 Tara Chak

Arrah 

 Agarsanda
 Alimullah Chak
 Alipur
 Amarpur Marwatia
 Amma
  Arrah (M Corp.)
 Babhnauli
 Baghakol
 Baghipakar
 Bahira Chak
 Bairampur
 Bakharia
 Bakhria
 Bakula
 Balua
 Balua
 Bara
 Basantpur
 Basantpur
 Basantpur
 Basmanpur
 Behra
 Bela
 Belghat
 Bhadea
 Bhakura
 Bheldumra
 Bhojpur
 Bhusahula
 Chamukha
 Chanda
 Chatarsainpur
 Chauki
 Chit Kundi
 Dalan Chhapra
 Dariapur
 Daulatpur
 Deorhi
 Dhamar
 Dharampura
 Dharampura
 Dhauandhua
 Dhobaha
 Dokti
 Dularpur Kosik
 Duraundha
 Ganauli
 Ganghar
 Garaiyan
 Gazipur
 Gheghta
 Ghoradei
 Gothahula
 Hasanpura
 Horlahi
 Ijri
  Jadopur
 Jamira
 Jura
 Karari
 Karra
 Karwa
 Khushhalpur
 Kunria
 Kurwa
 Lachhmanpur
 Mahadewa
 Mahazi Dokti
 Mahkampur Bara
 Mahuli
 Mainpura
 Makhdumpur Dumra
 Mathaulia
 Mathurapur
 Milki
 Mirza Beg
 Misraulia
 Mohanpur
 Nagopur
 Nayagaon
 Nirmalpur
 Parkhotampur
 Pathanpur
 Paut
 Pipra
 Pipra
 Pipra
 Piprahiya
 Piraunta
 Ramdih Chhapra
 Rampur
 Rampur Mathia
 Ramsara Chandar Chur
 Ratan Dularpur
 Ratanpur
 Rokaiya Chak
 Saidpur
 Sakatpura
 Salempur
 Santpur
 Sarangpur
 Sarsiwan
 Semaria
 Singhai
 Singhi Tola
 Sobhi Dumra
 Sonadia
 Sonadia
 Sonadia
 Sukulpur
 Sundarpur Barja
 Teksemar
 Tenua
 Tetaria
 Tulshipur
 Udaipur
 khajuria

Barhara 

 Achhai Chak
  Agarpura
 Akauna
 Babhangawan
  Babura
  Bakhorapur
 Bakhorapur English
  Balua
 Barhara
 Bhusahula
 Bishambharpur
 Bishunpur
  Chatar
 Chhinegaon
 Deorath
 Dokti (Ditto)
 Dost Muhammad Chak
 English
 Faizullah Chak
 Galchaur
 Gangauli
 Gazipur Farhada
 Ghanghar
 Gunri
 Gunri
  Gyanpur
 Humaun Chak
  Jagatpur
 Jalali Chak
 Jhokipur
  Jokahri
 Karja
  Kazi Chak
 Keotia
 Keshopur
 Khawaspur
 Khawaspur
 Khawaspur
 Khawaspur
 Khawaspur
 Kondarha Uparwar (Ditto)
 Krishnagarh
  Kudaria
 Kuiya
 Latif Chak
 Lauhar
 Lauhar
 Mah Chak
 Mahazi Dokti (Ditto)
 Majhauli
 Mariam Chak
  Matukpur
  Milki
 Milki Mir Chhaka
 Molna Chak
  Nargada
  Nathmalpur
 Nurpur
  Paiga
 Pakri
 Panditpur
  Parasrampur
 Pharna
 Piparpanti
 Raepur Binganwan
 Raghunathpur (Ditto)
  Ram Shahar
  Rampur
 Rampur Kondarha (Ditto)
 Ramsagar
 Sanjoel
  Saraiya
 Semaria Jionarain
 Semaria Pararia
 Sheo Diara (Ditto)
  Shivpur
  Sinha
 Sohra
  Turki

Behea 

 Amiya
 Amrai
  Andar
 Andauli
 Bagahin
 Banahin
 Bandha
 Bankat
 Bankat
 Bara
 Baruna
 Basdeopur
  Behea (NP)
 Bela
 Belauna
 Bharsanda Jado
 Bharsanda Mangit
 Bhinriya
 Bhoja Chak
 Bibi Mah Chak
 Bikrampur
 Bikrampur
 Birpur
 Chakwath
 Chaughara
 Dalpatpur
 Dariwan
 Dhanikara
 Dharhara
 Doghra
  Dubauli
 Dusadhi Chak
 Gajrar
 Garhatha
 Gaudar Chak Tal
 Gaudar Rudar Nagar
 Ghagha
  Hirdepur
 Itwa
  Jadopur
  Jamua
 Jogibir
 Kaleyanpur
 Kamriaon
 Kanela
 Kaneli
 Kanhai Geyan Sinh
 Karkhiyan
 Katea
 Kauriya
 Kawalpura
 Kewal Patti
 Khakhu Bandh
 Kharauni
 Kuardah
 Kundesar
 Mahuaon
 Makhdumpur
 Maniara
 Marinpur
 Marwatia
 Maujhali
 Meha Chak
 Misrauli
 Mohanpur
 Moti Rampur
 Nainagarha
 Narayanpur
 Narayanpur
 Nausha Tanr
 Nawada
 Nawadih
  Osain
 Pahari Pipra
 Parariya
 Patkhaulia
 Phingi
  Phulai
 Pipra Jagdis
 Rajaur
 Ramdatahi
 Ramdubwal
 Rampur
 Rani Sagar
 Rati Dubawal
 Rustampur
 Sahjauli
 Saho Dih
 Samardah
 Sharaur
 Shiupur
 Sikariya
 Sirampur
 Sukhari Chak
 Sukrauli
  Teghra
 Tetariya
 Tiar
 Tikhpur

Charpokhari 

 Amurza
 Babu bandh
 Bagahi
 Bagu sara
 Bajen
 Balihari
 Barahra
 Barar
 Barar English
 Barni
 Betari
 Bhairo Dih
 Bhaluana
 Bharhatha
 Chakiya
 Chand Dihri
 Charpokhri
 Dego Dehri
 Dekura
 Dhanauti
 Dherha
 Dhob Diha
 Dhusra
 Dube Dehra
 Dubea
 Dumariya
 Ekauni
 Gangajal Dehri
 Gauri Dih
 Harpur
 Itaura
 Jairampur
 Jaitpura
 Janea Dih
 Kalianpur
 Kanai
 Kashi Dih
 Kasmariya
 Kathrain
 Kathrain  Milik
 Kauwa Khot
 Keshopur
 Kharanti
 Kinu Dehri
 Koel
 Koel Arazi
 Kori
 Kumhaila
 Kusamhi
 Lilari
 Madain
 Madanpur
 Madarha
 Madarhi
 Madariha
 Madhuri
 Majhiawan
 Makundpur
 Malaur
 Malipur
 Manaini
 Mansagar
 Nagraon
 Nagri
 Narotimpur
 Pachma
 Paliya
 Panraria
 Panre Dih
 Pasaur
 Patkhauli
 Pem Akurha
 Piro Chak
 Pirtampur
 Rampur
 Rasulpur
 Repura
 Repura
 Sahaspura
 Sarbahan Dehri
 Saropur
 Semraon
 Siya Dih
 Sonbarsa
 Sukru
 Sundarpur
 Tetaria
 Thakuri
 Thegua
 Udhwa Dih

Garhani 

 Akrahi
 Azam Nagar
 Bagwa
 Bahadurpur
 Bahri
 Balbandh
 Baligaon
 Barap
 Baraura
 Bardiha
 Bhatauli
 Bhinrari
 Chaiyan Chak
 Chandi
 Dehri
 Deodhi
 Deopur
 Dhamanian
 Dhandhauli
 Dhokraha
 Dolaur Dehri
  Dubauli
 Dularpur
 Garhani
 Garhani Taluk
 Gaura
 Hadia Bad
 Harpur
 Ichari
 Karnaul
  Kaup
  Kurkuri
  Labhuani
 Lakarsen
 Mandura
 Manduri
  Morasia
 Mukundpur
 Paharpur
 Pararia
 Pathar
 Pipra
 Ram Dihra
  Rampur
 Ratanpur
 Sahangi
 Shivpur
 Sihar
 Sikaria
 Sikti
 Sohari
 Suaraha
 Suari
 Tenduni

Jagdishpur 

  Aer
 Afzalpur
  Anharibag
 Araila
 Asodhan
  Asodhar
 Babhniyawan
  Bachri
  Bahuwara
 Bairahi
 Baluwanhi
 Bankat
 Bara Pokhar
 Barad Parwa
 Bariar Patti
 Barnaon
 Basauna
 Bharsara
 Bhatauli
 BichlaJangalMahalJagdishpur
 Bimawan
 Chakwa
  Dalippur
 Danwan
  Deorar
 Dhaka Karam
  Dhangain
 Dihri
 Dilia
 Diliya
 Diul
 Dubhar
  Dulaur
 Gangadhar Dehri
 Geyanpura
  Gurez
  Hardiya
 Harigaon
 Harna Tanr
 Hathpokhar
  Hetampur
 Isanri
  Jagdishpur (NP)
 Jamui Horil
 Jamui Khanr
 Kahen
 Kakila
 Kali Bali
 Kataibojh
 Kaunra
 Kesari
 Khutaha
 Kinnu Dehri
 Korhwa
  Kunai
  Kusaha
 Kusamha
 Lahijohar
 Lakhanpura
  Mahurahi
 Mangitpur
 Mangura
 Manhtati
 Manjhupur
 Mannu Dehri
  Masurhi
 Mathurapur
 Misrauliya
  Mungaul
 Narayanpur
 Neur Pokhar
 Paliya
 Paliya Chak
 Panapur
 Parasiya
 Pipra
 Rangarua
 Repura
 Saniya Barahta
  Shiupur
 Siyaruwa
  Sonbarsa
 Sondhi
 Sultanpur
 Sundara
 Tenduni
 Tikthi
 Tulsi
 Ugna
 Ujiyarpur
 UtarwariJangalMahalJagdishpur
 Uttardaha

Koilwar 

 Amma Narbirpur
 Babhnauli
 Bahiyara
 Bakar Nagar
 Bhadwar
 Bhagwatpur
 Bhopatpur
 Birampur
 Bishunpur
 Bishunpura
 Chanda
 Chandi
 Chandwa
 Chhitampur
 Daulatpur
 Deoria
 Dhan Diha
 Dhandiha
 Dumaria
 Farhangpur
 Giddha
 Golakpur
 Gopalpur
 Guri
 Gyanpur
 Haripur
 Imadpur
 Jahanpur
 Jalpura
 Jalpura Tapa
 Jamalpur
 Jogta
 Kaem Nagar
 Kazi Chak
 Khangaon
 Khesrahiya
 Kiratpura
 Kishunpura
  Koilwar (NP)
 Kulharia
 Kusihan
 Lodipur
 Mahui
 Majhauwan
 Makhdumpur
 Makhdumpur Semra
 Mana Chak
 Manikpur
 Manpur
 Mathurapur
 Milki
 Mirapur
 Mohaddi Chak
 Mohkampur
 Mokhalsa
 Narbirpur
 Narhi
 Pachaina
 Pachrukhia
 Purdilganj
 Rajapur
 Raundh Santpur
 Sadasibpur Urf Sabdalpur
 Sakaddi
 Sirari Chak
 Sirpalpur
 Sirpalpur
 Songhatta
 Sundarpur
 Sundra
 Suraudha
 kamalu Chak

Piro 

 Agiaon
 Akrua
 Amai
 Amehta
 Angra
 Anuwan
  Bachri
 Baghaunr
 Bahri Mahadeo
 Baisa Dih
 Bamhawar
 Barao
 Barauli
 Baraura
 Basdiha
 Baseya
 Basmanpur
 Bedauli
 Beduwa
 Bharsar
 Bhulkua
 Birpur
 Bishambharpur
 Chanwa
 Chaubepur
 Chhaurahi Jangal Mahal
 Chhechhu Dih
 Chilbilia
 Dano Dih
 Danwarua
 Deochanda
 Dhan Pokhar
 Dhanpura
 Dihri
 Doman Dehra
 Ear
 Gajra Dih
 Garahatha
 Gobind Dih
 Gogsand
 Harpur
 Haswa Dehri
 Hat Pokhar
 Indarpatpur
 Itamba Ganesh
 Jagdeopur
 Jagdishpur Patak
 Jaisingh Dih
 Jamaurahi
 Jamuaon
 Jamunipur
 Jitaura Jangal Mahal
 Kachhuhi
 Kachnath
 Karauniya
 Kaser
  Katar
 Kataria
 Keshwa
 Kewatia
 Khairahin
 Khambha Dih
 Khandani
 Khandani Khurd
 Kheri Kon
 Khorain
 Kothua
 Kukrahan
 Lahthan
 Lohain
 Lohrabad
 Mahuari
 Mahwari
 Manaini
 Marohi
 Mothi
 Mothibal Jangal Mahal
 Moti Dih
 Naek Tola Jangal Mahal
 Narayanpur
 Narayanpur
 Narhi
 Newari
 Nonar
 Pachman
 Pachrukhia
 Pharaura
  Piro (NP)
 Pitat
 Pitro
 Puraini Buzurg
 Puraini Khurd
 Rajapur
 Rajeyan
 Rangal Tola Jangal Mahal
 Rasauli
 Sahejani
 Salakhna
 Saneya
 Sugibal
 Sukhrauli
 Tar
 Telar
 Tetar Dih
 Tewari Dih
 Tilath
 Tiwari Dih
 Udan Dih
 Ujjain Dehra
 Waina

Sahar 

 Abgilla
 Amruhan
 Andhari
 Andhari Mahazi
 Anuwa
 Athpa
 Bagaunti
 Bahuara
 Bajrean
 Bansi Dehri
 Baruhi
 Bhopatpur
 Bishunpura
 Chak Chaudhari
 Chauri
 Chhatarpura
 Dehri
 Dhanchhuhan
 Dharampur
 Dhauri
 Dhauri Chak
 Ekwari
 Fatehpur
 Gulzarpur
 Harpur
 Hatimganj
 Inurkhi
 Jagdish Chak
 Janaidih
 Janpuria
 Jot Gobind
 Kanpahari
 Karbasin
 Kaul Dehri
 Khaira
 Kharaon Buzurg
 Kharaon Chaturbhuj
 Koni
 Koriar
 Kunrwa
 Kusiar
 Lodipur
 Mahabirganj
 Mathurapur
 Newada
 Nima
 Ojhaulia
 Patarpura
 Patrihan
 Perhap
 Peur
 Peur Chak
 Purhara
  Sahar
 Sakhuana
 Shiw Chak

Sandesh 

 Ahiman Chak
 Ahpura
 Akhgaon
 Baga
 Balra
 Bara
 Baranhpur
 Bardiha
 Bartiar
 Basauri
 Bhanpura
 Bhatauli
 Bhikham Chak
 Bichhiaon
 Chanchar
 Chauria
 Chela
 Chilhauns
 Dalelganj
 Dehri
 Deoar
 Dharampur
 Dihra
 Gaighat
 Jamuaon
 Jansara
 Kanharpur
 Khandaul
 Khemkaranpur
 Kholpur
 Kori
 Kosdihra
 Kusra
 Lodipur
 Mahadeopur
 Maniach
 Nansagar
 Narainpur
 Nasratpur
 Panpura
 Panrepur
 Partappur
 Parura
 Parura Rampur
 Patkhaulia
 Phulari
 Pinjroi
 Raman Sanrh
 Salempur
  Sandesh
 Sarimpur Bachri
 Surungapur
 Turkaul
 Udaibhanpur

Shahpur 

 Abatana
 Baharwar
 Bahoranpur Bazar (Ditto)
 Bahoranpur Dakhinwar
 Bahoranpur Diara (Ditto)
 Bamhnauli
 Bansipur
 Barmhapa
 Barsaun
 Basdeopur
 Beas Chak
 Belauthi
 Bhainsaha
 Bharauli
 Bhikhampur
 Bhim Patti
 Bhimpatti
 Bhusahula (Ditto)
 Bimari
 Bishunpur
 Bishunpur
 Bishunpur (Ditto)
 Chaki Nauranga
 ChakkiNauranga MasumeMahaziRam Karhi
 ChakkiNaurangaMahaz Rashulpur
 ChakkiNaurangaMasumeRasulpur Ramkarhi
 ChakkiNaurangaOjhwaliaDiara
 Chamarpur
 Chanchar
 Chanda
 Char Ghat
 Chicharampur (Ditto)
 Damodarpur (Ditto)
 Deomalpur
 Dewaich Kundi
 Dharmangatpur
 Dhauri
 Dhiratpura
 Dhokaria Chak
 Dilmanpur
 Domariya
 Dudh Ghat
 Dumariya
 Gabindpur
 Gangapur (Ditto)
 Garaya
 Gashainpur
 Gaura
 Gobindpur
 Goreriya (Ditto)
 Gosainpur
 Hariharpur
 Harkhi Pipra
 Isharpura
 Isharpura Naubarar (Ditto)
 Jagdeopur
 Jaugarh
 Jawania (Ditto)
 Jhaua
 Kadam Ka Dera (Ditto)
 Karanpura
 Kariman ThakurKaDera (Ditto)
 Karja
 Karnamenpur
 Kazi Chak
 Keotiya
 Khagraha
 Kharaun
 Khutaha
 Kunriya
 Lachatola Bersingha (Ditto)
 Lachhmanpur
 LachhmiAhirKaDera (Ditto)
 Lalu Ahir Ka Dera (Ditto)
 Lashkara
 Lat
 Lilari
 Madhopur (Ditto)
 Mahapur
 Maharaja
 Mahazi Dokti (Ditto)
 Mahuar Inglish
 Manoharpur
 Mansa Chak
 Mansinghpur
 Milki Gopalpur
 Mirchaiya Ka Dera (Ditto)
 Misrauliya
 Mohji Nardarai (Ditto)
 Nandlal Ka Dera (Ditto)
 Nandpur
 Nardara Khas
 Nargada
 Nathpae
 Nipania (Ditto)
 Pachkauri Ka Dera (Ditto)
 Paharpur
 Pakri
 Panrepur
 Parariya
 Parsonda
 Parsotimpur
 Parsotimpur (Ditto)
 Parsram- patti
 Patti Siswa
 Pipra Ganesh (Ditto)
 Pursotampur (Ditto)
 Rajauli
 Raksaur
 Ram Dayal Ka Dera (Ditto)
 Ram Karhi (Ditto)
 Ramchandar Semaria
 Ramdatahi
 Ramdihra
 Randa Dih
 Repura (Ditto)
 Sahjauli
 Saiya Ka Dera (Ditto)
 Salempur Diara (Ditto)
 Salempur Mahazi (Ditto)
 Sarangpur (Ditto)
 Sarna
 Semariya Palti Ojha
  Shahpur (NP)
 Sobhanathhi (Ditto)
 Sonbarsa
 Sonbarsa Diar (Ditto)
 Sonki
 Sugar Chapra (Ditto)
 Suhiya
 Suremarpur (Ditto)
 Tapsi Ka Dera (Ditto)
 Tika Semaria (Ditto)
 Tikapur
 Tikthi
 Udhopur (Ditto)
 Udhopur (Ditto)
 Zamin Fazil (Ditto)

Tarari 

 Adhar Dih
 Afzal Chak
 Akraunj
 Amaharua
 Bagar
 Baghsanda
 Bahadurpur
 Balua
 Bandhwa
 Barka Gaon
 Basauri
 Basra
 Beldehri
 Berain
 Bhadsera
 Bhakura
 Bheriya
 Bhopatpur
 Bihta
 Bipan Dih
 Birhar
 Bishamharpur
 Bishunpura
 Burhi Jethwar
 Chakia
 Chanda
 Dari Dih
 Deo
 Deo Arazi
 Dewria
 Dhamna
 Dhangawan
 Dharhiya
 Dihri
 Dilia
 Dumaria
 Durupur
 Fatehpur
 Gaharua
 Gangti
 Gaura
 Gazo Dih
 Gopalpur
 Gudan Dih
  Hardiya
 Harla
 Harpur
 Hurrua
 Imadpur
 Itahri
 Itman
 Jethwar Bhat
 Kab Dehra
 Kanu Dih
 Karath
 Kariman Chak
 Karma  Misir
 Khairulla Chak
 Kharwana
 Khutaha
 Kiratpur
 Kisai Dih
 Kudariya
 Kurmorhi
 Kusdehra
 Kusumhi
 Labna
 Lachchhi Dih
 Mahadeopur
 Mahesh Dih
 Malwe
 Manikpur
 Manpur
 Moap Buzurg
 Moap Khurd
 Narayanpur
 Naua
 Nawa Dih
  Nirbhai Dehra
 Noni Dih
 Ojha Dih
 Panwari
 Paranpura
 Parariya
 Parasiya
 Patelwa
 Patkhauli
 Phitko
 Pipra
 Rajmal Dih
 Rajpur
 Ramnagar
 Ranni
 Sadhwa Yakub
 Sahiara
 Saidanpur
 Salempur
 Salhadia
 Santokha Chak
 Sapta Dih
 Sara
 Sarphora
 Sauna
 Sedha
 Shankar Dih
 Sikarhata
 Sikarhata Khurd
 Sikarhata Milik
 Sikraur
 Sonar Dihri
 Surmana
 Tanrwa
  Tarari
 Usri
 Warsi

Udwant Nagar 

 Akhtiarpur
 Asni
 Bajruha
 Bakri
 Baon Pali
 Bargahi
 Basauri
 Behra Sabalpur
 Belaur
 Bhawanpur
 Bhelain
 Bhopatpur
 Bhupauli
 Bibiganj
 Birampur
 Bishunpur
 Chakia
 Chaursani
 Chorain
 Dariapur
 Dehri
 Demhan
 Deoria
 Diliya
 Dubedah
 Ekauna
 Eraura
 Garha
 Gorhna
 Harnath Kundi
 Indarpura
 Jaitpur
 Kalyanpur
 Kari Sath
 Kasap
 KawalKundi
 Khajuata
 Khalisa
 Kharauni
 Khiritanr
 Konhara
 Kusamha
 Kusamhi
 Madhubani
 Mahatwania
 Mahuli Buzurg
 Mahuli Khurd
 Malthar
 Mangatpur
  Masar
 Milki
 Milki
 Misraulia
 Morath
 Nawa Nagar
 Nawada
 Nima
 Pakariabar
 Patar
 Piania
 Pirozpur
 Raghopur
 Rampur
 Sakhua
 Salthar
 Saraiya
 Sarthua
 Sasram
 Savgar
 Sikandarpur
 Sirampur
 Sonpura
 Surni
 Tetaria
 Udwantnagar
 khiritanr Milki

References 

Bhojpur district
Bhojpur district, India